Purvis Peak is a peak (2,250 m) 2 nautical miles (3.7 km) northeast of Mount Northampton in the Victory Mountains of Victoria Land. The peak overlooks the terminus of Tucker Glacier from the south. Mapped by New Zealand Geological Survey Antarctic Expedition (NZGSAE), 1957–58, and the United States Geological Survey (USGS), 1960–62. Named by Advisory Committee on Antarctic Names (US-ACAN) for Lieutenant (later Lieutenant Cdr.) Ronald S. Purvis, U.S. Navy, of Squadron VX-6, pilot of Otter aircraft at Ellsworth Station, 1956–57, and of R5D Skymaster aircraft at McMurdo Station, 1957–58.

Mountains of Victoria Land
Borchgrevink Coast